Talgo (officially Patentes Talgo, SAU) is a Spanish manufacturer of intercity, standard, and high-speed passenger trains. Talgo is an abbreviation of Tren Articulado Ligero Goicoechea Oriol (English: Lightweight articulated train Goicoechea Oriol)

The company was founded by Alejandro Goicoechea and José Luis Oriol. It was first incorporated in 1942.

Corporate history
The creation of Talgo can be largely credited to the work of two individuals, Alejandro Goicoechea and José Luis Oriol. During the 1930s, Goicoechea, a pioneering railway engineer, sought to produce a new generation of rolling stock that would be primarily composed of metal, rather than wood; to reduce operational cost, he also emphasised lightweight yet sturdy construction, while a low center of gravity would deter derailing and thus permit higher operating speeds. In 1942, financial backing for the construction of a prototype train was provided by Oriol, who believed in Goicoechea's concepts; the two produced the agreement that established Patentes Talgo as a company that same year. This prototype train would emerge as the Talgo I.

During the late 1940s, Talgo came to recognize that Spain and the wider European continent, were in a poor economic condition following the Second World War and thus were unlikely to be forthcoming as customers for new rolling stocks from an unproven manufacturer. Furthermore, the company was keen to acquire advanced technical knowledge and designs; a favourable agreement was struck with American Car and Foundry (ACF) to collaborate on the manufacture of the Talgo II in the United States. The first vehicles arrived in Spain in 1950, enabling the first commercial Talgo II service to be run on 14 July of that year between Madrid, Spain and Hendaye, France. It was the first train in Spain to be authorized to travel at a service speed of up to 75 miles per hour. Continued collaboration with ACF led to the creation of the Talgo III during the 1960s. It was brought into service between Madrid and Barcelona in August 1964.

International rail transit between Spain and the rest of Europe had been historically impacted by the differing track gauge at either side of the Pyrenees. Recognising the value in effectively addressing this impediment. Talgo developed its own variable-gauge vehicle system, which permitted the first international Talgo to be introduced to passenger service between Barcelona, Spain and Geneva, Switzerland, in 1969. Such variable-gauge trains were soon a common feature of overnight services between various Spanish cities and numerous destinations across Western Europe. Even into the twenty-first century, the variable-gauge system has largely remained unchanged even on new-build rolling stock. La Gineta is the site of a test track of the Talgo RD railway gauge changer.

During the 1970s, Talgo sought to better address demand for higher speed trains in Spain; as a consequence of its mountainous terrain, relatively curved tracks prevailed despite this restricting line speeds as a consequence of centrifugal forces exerted on the trains (and their contents). To permit higher operating speeds under such conditions, the company developed a tilting train, the Talgo Pendular, that automatically compensated for centrifugal forces by tilting appropriately on bends. Without needing to modify the track infrastructure, this tilting train permitted operating speeds to be increased by up to 25 percent over conventional trains.

During the 1970s and 1980s, the company focused its activities largely on the manufacturing of coaching stock rather than locomotives. A renewed focus on locomotive development, incorporating the automatic variable gauge system, came about during the 1990s; the Talgo XXI pioneered various technologies for the company, including new high-speed running gear and hybrid propulsion technology. In 1988, the Spanish government announced its decision to construct a new dedicated high-speed line between Madrid and Seville; Talgo, being keen to produce rolling stock for this new opportunity, immediately set about designing a new series of trains, the Talgo 350. A key feature of this trainset would be its maximum speed, which was 186 miles per hour. In 1998, Talgo partnered with the multinational rolling stock manufacturer Adtranz to collaborate on its bid to secure a contract to provide the rolling stock for the new high speed line. 

The company's long term primary customer, and thus the main source of its revenues, is the Spanish railway operator Renfe. By 2001, Talgo was reportedly spending between 10 and 12 percent of its revenues on various research and development programmes. 

On 12 May 1999, Talgo announced it had signed a deal to acquire the Finnish rolling stock manufacturer Transtech Oy, which it subsequently reorganised as the wholly-owned subsidiary Talgo Oy. In March 2007, Talgo sold its shares in Talgo Oy to a combination of its local management and other Finnish investors, after which the Transtech name was readopted.

During the 2010s, it was decided that Talgo would be reorganised as a public company. In May 2015, the company made an initial public offering (IPO) on the Bolsa de Madrid, during which it was valued at €1.27 billion.

In recent decades, Talgo has made a renewed effort to expand its presence internationally. During the late 2010s, Talgo made arrangements to establish a new train manufacturing site in the United Kingdom in response to orders for its trains having been placed by multiple British railway operators. In the early 2020s, the company opted to invested in new manufacturing facilities in India with the aiming of securing sizable orders from across the country's highly-trafficked railways.

Design

Talgo trains are best known for their unconventional articulated railway passenger cars that use in-between carriage bogies that Talgo patented in 1941, similar to the earlier Jacobs bogie. The wheels are mounted in pairs but not joined by an axle and the bogies are shared between coaches rather than underneath individual coaches. This allows a railway car to take a turn at higher speeds with less hunting oscillation. As the coaches are not mounted directly onto wheel bogies, the coaches are more easily insulated from track noise. This design has been proposed for further utilisation in the Talgo 22, double deck train with stepless access from the platform to the lower deck and between carriages.

Talgo trains fitted with variable gauge axles can change rail gauge - for instance at the / at the Spanish-French border interchange.

Since the introduction of the Talgo Pendular in 1980, the train tilts naturally inwards on curves, allowing it to run faster on curves without causing discomfort to passengers. The carriage tilting system pivots around the top of the suspension columns, which has the effect of partially cancelling the effects of lateral acceleration when cornering.

Trains
Talgo trains are divided into a number of generations. They come in both locomotive hauled and self-propelled versions.

Talgo I

The Talgo I was built in 1942 in Spain. The coaches were built at the "Hijos de Juan Garay" workshop in Oñati and the power car was built at the workshops of the "Compañía del Norte" in Valladolid. It was built as a prototype, and it was used to set several railroad speed records. The first test run occurred between Madrid and Guadalajara, Castile-La Mancha in October 1942.It had a max speed of 115 km/h on uphills and 135 km/h on flat/downhills. The trainset was destroyed on February 5, 1944 after approximately 3000 km of testing in a fire at its storage location, a warehouse in Cerra Negro.

Talgo II

Talgo II coaches and locomotives were first built in 1950 at the American Car and Foundry Company (ACF) works in the United States under the direction of Spanish engineers (the diesel-electric locomotives were assembled by ACF with electrical components made by General Electric). Talgo II carried most of the Jet Rocket train's passengers between Chicago and Peoria, Illinois, after entering service on the Chicago, Rock Island and Pacific Railroad (the Rock Island line) in 1956. Slightly different coaches were later introduced, and the last car type of the Jet Rocket resembled that of the future Talgo III. The New York Central Railroad trialed a complete train until 1958 but saw little success.

Talgo IIs also entered service under Renfe as the Renfe Class 350, where they ran between Madrid and Palencia.

Talgo IIs were also built for the New York, New Haven and Hartford Railroad for its "John Quincy Adams" train from New York City to Boston, Massachusetts, and the Boston and Maine Railroad for its "Speed Merchant" train, running between Boston and Portland, Maine. Soon afterwards, Talgo II trains began running in Spain and were successfully operated until 1972.

Talgo III

Talgo III coaches and locomotives entered service in 1964, introducing longer cars and easy directional reversibility of the coaches. The Talgo III/RD was equipped with variable gauge axles, and this permitted the introduction, on 1 June 1969, of the first through train between Barcelona and Geneva (the Catalan Talgo), despite the difference in rail gauge. The same equipment was used for the Barcelona Talgo, which began operation on 26 May 1974 as the first-ever through train service between Barcelona and Paris.

Talgo Pendular

The Talgo Pendular (Talgo IV and Talgo V, also VI & Talgo 200 or 6th generation), introduced in 1980, created the "natural tilting" train, using a passive system that tilts the carriages with no need for electronic sensors or hydraulic equipment. The wheels are mounted on mono axles between the carriages, and sitting on top of the axles are suspension columns. The carriages are attached to the top of the suspension columns and swing inwards as the train goes through a curve.

In 1988, a Talgo Pendular was used on trials for Amtrak on the Boston-New York corridor in the United States and on Deutsche Bahn lines in Germany. Trial commercial services with Talgo cars in the US commenced in 1994 between Seattle and Portland, and from 1998 different trains have been used on the Amtrak Cascades services from Vancouver, British Columbia south to Seattle, Washington, continuing south via Portland, Oregon to Eugene, Oregon. Five Talgo IV trains were in use in Argentina on the General Roca Railway. They have since been replaced by CRRC Dalian rolling stock. In September 2022, the Talgo IV sets were transported to the Villa Luro workshop to undergo repairs, aiming to add an extra daily service between Buenos Aires and Rosario. The sets used on the Amtrak Cascades have been replaced by Amtrak-owned Horizon cars.

Talgo 200 series trains are also in use in Kazakhstan for the Almaty–Astana overnight train.

Talgo VII

The Talgo VII introduced beginning in 2000 is used as a locomotive-pulled train set as well as intermediate cars for the multiple units Talgo 250, Talgo 350 and Talgo XXI. The carriages are similar to the Talgo Pendular type but have an air-controlled hydraulic brake system and power supply from head end power instead of diesel engine-generators in the end cars. Talgo VII trains have a car which has two pairs of wheels in the middle of the set (of cars) rather than at one end of the set, which is the case for earlier Talgo trains. All the other cars in the set have a single pair of wheels.

Talgo 8

The Series 8 passenger cars are similar to the Series VII cars, but the diesel generator car at one end of the train has a control cabin for push-pull operation and a two-axle end bogie. These trains are designed for the North American market. Talgo made an agreement in 2009 to build a manufacturing facility in Wisconsin which would initially supply two 14-car trainsets for the Amtrak Hiawatha Service until the project was cancelled. The company expressed hope the plant would later be used to build trains for other U.S. rail projects.

Early in 2010, the Oregon Department of Transportation announced that it had negotiated the purchase of two 13-car trainsets for use in the Pacific Northwest rail corridor between Eugene and Vancouver, British Columbia. These trainsets were also manufactured in Wisconsin and were delivered in 2013. The sets are currently operating in the "Cascades" corridor in the Pacific Northwest. They have been integrated with the five existing sets in regular service. The Series 8 trains offer passengers many modern amenities including high-speed Wi-Fi, reclining seats and a full-service bistro and lounge car.

In 2014, the state of Michigan expressed interest in operating the unused Talgo 8 cars for their Amtrak Wolverine service. Three years later, Amtrak proposed to lease or buy the unused cars in the wake of the 2017 Washington train derailment. Ultimately, the two trainsets were sold to Nigeria for use on the Lagos Rail Mass Transit.

Talgo 9

This series, which was originally designed for Russia and Kazakhstan, featured wide bodyshells and wheelsets. There are three versions, consisting of either 1520 mm fixed gauge, 1520-1435 mm variable gauge or 1520-1676 mm variable gauge. They are used in the Berlin-Moscow line (December 2016), St. Petersburg-Moscow-Samara (August 2020).

In July 2015, Talgo stated its intention to ship a Series 9 train to India at its own cost as a demonstration on the Mumbai-Delhi rail route. On 10 September 2016, the final successful test run of the Talgo 9 series coaches was completed in India.

Talgo 250 HSR

The Talgo 250 is a dual voltage electric train (AC/DC) equipped with variable gauge axles. This allows the units to be used on high-speed lines and on conventional broad gauge lines. A Talgo 250 train consists of two power cars and 11 Talgo VII intermediate coaches. This class was developed for Renfe (classed as S-130). One trainset (RENFE Class 730) was involved in the Santiago de Compostela accident on 24 July 2013.

Uzbekistan Railways ordered two Talgo 250 sets of a Russian gauge version in 2009. The first set arrived at Tashkent in July 2011.

Talgo 250 Hybrid

The Talgo 250 Hybrid is a dual-voltage, dual-power train equipped with variable gauge axles. The train is therefore also able to operate on non-electrified lines. A Talgo 250 Hybrid train consists of two power cars, two technical end coaches and nine Talgo VII intermediate coaches. The trains were developed for Renfe  and classed initially as S-130H, later as S-730. They are rebuilt from existing Talgo 250 trains.

Talgo 350 HSR

The Talgo 350 entered service as the Renfe AVE Class 102 marking the company's entry into the high-speed train manufacturing market. Tests with the prototype commenced in 1994, and Talgo 350 trains have been operating at a top commercial speed of 330 km/h on the Madrid-Barcelona and Madrid-Valladolid lines since 22 December 2007. The train consists of two power cars and Talgo VII intermediate cars with improved brakes and additional primary suspension.

Talgo XXI HSR

Talgo XXI is a project for a high-speed diesel-powered train, that operates in push-pull with one or two power cars and Talgo VII intermediate cars. The North American version has four-axle power cars in compliance with United States FRA regulations. Only one train in compliance with European UIC standards has been built to date. Talgo reported that the Talgo XXI attained  on the Olmedo-Medina del Campo high speed experimental line on 9 July 2002, which led to a claim for the world speed record for a diesel train. However, this claim was never proven. After the test runs the train was sold to the Spanish infrastructure authority ADIF as a measuring train for high-speed lines.

Possible specs are:
 Two MTU 12V 4000 R64 engines (two power car configuration) or one MTU 12V 4000 R84 engine (one power car configuration), up to 1,800 rpm, high-speed diesel, Euro IIIB compliant with diesel particulate filter and exhaust gas recirculation after-treatment system
 2 x , or 
 Voith hydraulic transmission
 Hydrodynamic and air braking
 Variable gauge
 5 to 12 passenger coaches, depending on the setup
 Up to 400 seats
 Designed for a top speed of 220 km/h (135 mph)
 Power car with a shared trailer axle

Talgo AVRIL HSR

The system uses underfloor traction in the front and rear vehicles, with the intermediate carriages having the Talgo Pendular system (which cannot use motored axles on the axles corresponding to the system). Starting with the concept stage in 2009, it began dynamic testing on the Spanish high-speed network in 2014, and was approved in May 2016. It won its first major contract in November 2016 for the Mediterranean corridor in Spain, and its link to Paris.

Talgo Egypt 
In April 2019, Egypt ordered new Talgo trains. Egypt contracted for six trains from Talgo Company, but they became seven trains due to a delay in the delivery date to Egypt. This negates the words of the Minister of Transport who justified that train is a gift from the company for President Abdel Fattah El-Sisi.

There is also a possibility of corruption in the train deal, as Transport Minister Kamel Al-Wazir announced that the deal cost Egypt $126 million, but the company announced the details of the deal, which amounted to $172 million, on the company's official website.

On 9 Aug 2022, Egypt contracted for seven trains from Talgo, which included 15-year maintenance, for 280 million euros. The trains will be delivered at the beginning of 2024.

Variable Gauge Axles (VGA)
In addition to the multiple units  with Variable Gauge Axles, Talgo built in 2005 a prototype of a VGA locomotive (the L-9202, TRAV-CA, 130-901 or Virgen del Buen Camino).

See also

 Amtrak Cascades
 Articulated car
 EMD LWT12
 Haramain High Speed Rail Project
 FM P-12-42
 Tilting train
 UAC TurboTrain
 Wheelset (railroad)

References

External links

 Talgo Official Site
 Talgo America Web site (English)
 Talgo Deutschland
 Interactive 360° panoramas of the interiors of  Talgo 7, Avril, Talgo 4 cama, Talgo 6 (DB)